The Way for the Millennium is a  east–west route across Staffordshire, deliberately designed for easy walking, using towpaths, old railway lines and footpaths and visiting attractive countryside and green spaces.

Route
The path starts east of Newport, Shropshire, and follows the disused Newport to Stafford railway line via Gnosall, Haughton and Derrington. Crossing Stafford town centre, it picks up the Staffordshire and Worcestershire and Trent and Mersey canals through Milford, Shugborough and Rugeley, then crosses open country from Armitage via Yoxall to Wychnor. It then rejoins the Trent and Mersey north via Barton-under-Needwood, ending in Burton upon Trent.

External links 

Way for the Millennium - The Ramblers Association 
Doxey Marshes - Staffordshire Wildlife Trust 

Footpaths in Staffordshire
Long-distance footpaths in England
Newport, Shropshire